Valuthur is a village in the Papanasam taluk of Thanjavur district, Tamil Nadu, India.

Demographics 

As per the 2001 census, Valathur had a total population of 5016 with 2356 males and 2560 females. The sex ratio was 1129. The literacy rate was 75.95.

References 

 

Villages in Thanjavur district